Anna is a 2015 Colombian drama film directed by Jacques Toulemonde Vidal. The film was named on the shortlist for Colombia's entry for the Academy Award for Best Foreign Language Film at the 89th Academy Awards, but it was not selected.

Cast
 Kolia Abiteboul as Nathan
 Juana Acosta as Anna
 Bruno Clairefond as Bruno
 Fabrice Colson as L'homme à l'aéroport
 Augustin Legrand as Philippe

Awards and nominations

Goya Awards

References

External links
 

2015 films
2015 drama films
Colombian drama films
2010s Spanish-language films
2010s Colombian films
2010s French films
French drama films